Carl Gerges is a Lebanese musician and architect. Gerges has been featured on the cover of L'officiel Levant and on the cover of Architectural Digest Middle East as an architect; and on the Middle East edition of Rolling Stone magazine  and GQ Middle East as a musician.

Biography 
Carl Gerges was born on December 5, 1987, in Beirut. He started playing the drums and the piano at an early age. Gerges co-founded Mashrou' Leila in 2008 while studying architecture at the American University of Beirut. He officially launched his architecture studio Carl Gerges Architects in March of 2020.

Music career 
Gerges is one of the founding members of Mashrou' Leila along with Hamed Sinno, Haig Papazian and Firas Abou Fakher. He started playing the drums, synths and electronics, and composing songs with the band in 2008. He's also heavily involved in the artistic direction of the band's music videos, visuals, and stage design. 

In 2017 Gerges taught a graduate workshop at the Hagop Kevorkian Institute for Near Eastern Studies at NYU as part of Mashrou' Leila. He also collaborated with notable artists like Roisin Murphy, Joe Goddard, Brian Eno, and Yo Yo Ma. 

In 2019 Gerges performed at the Metropolitan Museum of Art as part of British artist Oliver Beer's Vessel Orchestra Exhibition alongside several notable artists including John Zorn, Nico Muhly and several others.

Architecture career 
After pursuing a decade of architectural ventures, Gerges launched his studio, Carl Gerges Architects. His home, which he designed, got a cover story in Architectural Digest Middle East.

References

External links 
 
 https://www.instagram.com/carlgergesarchitects/
 

Lebanese rock musicians
Lebanese composers
Lebanese architects

Alternative rock musicians
Musicians from Beirut
American University of Beirut alumni
Drummers
1987 births
Living people